The Waikerí or Guaiqueríes were an indigenous people of northern Venezuela. They may have been related to the Warao people, or to the Arawaks or Cumanagotos. The Waikerí lived primarily on Venezuela's coastal islands of Isla Margarita, Cubagua and Coche, as well as in the nearby coastal areas of the mainland, such as the Araya Peninsula.

According to Alexander von Humboldt, the Waikerí  said that their language and that of the Warao were related.

References

Indigenous peoples in Venezuela